Đorđe Nikolić (born 13 April 1997) is a Serbian professional footballer who plays as a goalkeeper for Hungarian club Újpest and the Serbia national team.

Club career

Jagodina
After he left youth team of FK Partizan, Nikolić signed a three-year contract with Jagodina in the winter break off-season 2014–15. He made his Serbian SuperLiga debut for Jagodina in the first fixture of 2015–16 season. Although he started season as a first choice, Nikolić injured during the season and missed the great part of season. He made total 19 matches for club and after Jagodina relegated from the Serbian SuperLiga, Nikolić got an offer from FC Basel.

Basel
Nikolić signed four-year contract with FC Basel in June 2016. He made his debut for the club in 26 fixture match of the 2016–17 Swiss Super League season against FC St. Gallen, played on 1 April 2017. Under trainer Urs Fischer Nikolić won the Swiss Super League championship at the end of the 2016–17 Super League season. For the club this was the eighth title in a row and their 20th championship title in total. They also won the Swiss Cup for the twelfth time, which meant they had won the double for the sixth time in the club's history. In summer 2017, Nikolić moved on loan to the Swiss Challenge League side Schaffhausen, where he spent the rest of calendar year. Later, at the beginning of 2018, Nikolić moved to Thun on new loan, until summer 2019.

International career
Nikolić has been called in national team selections since 2012. In November 2016, Nikolić started playing with Serbian under-20 level as a first choice goalkeeper, until March 2017. After Boris Radunović's injury, coach Nenad Lalatović invited him to the squad for the 2017 UEFA European Under-21 Championship.

He made his debut for Serbia national football team on 7 June 2021 in a friendly against Jamaica.

Career statistics

Club

International

Honours 
Basel
 Swiss Super League: 2016–17
 Swiss Cup winner: 2016–17

References

External links
 Đorđe Nikolić stats at utakmica.rs 
 
 
 
 

1997 births
Living people
Footballers from Belgrade
Association football goalkeepers
Serbian footballers
Serbia youth international footballers
Serbia under-21 international footballers
Serbia international footballers
FK Jagodina players
FC Basel players
FC Schaffhausen players
FC Thun players
Újpest FC players
Swiss Challenge League players
Swiss Super League players
Serbian SuperLiga players
Nemzeti Bajnokság I players
Serbian expatriate footballers
Serbian expatriate sportspeople in Switzerland
Expatriate footballers in Switzerland
Serbian expatriate sportspeople in Hungary
Expatriate footballers in Hungary